Dinguiraye is a prefecture located in the Faranah Region of Guinea. The capital is Dinguiraye. The prefecture covers an area of 7,965 km.² and has a population of 195,662.

Sub-prefectures
The prefecture is divided administratively into 8 sub-prefectures:
 Dinguiraye-Centre
 Banora
 Dialakoro
 Diatiféré
 Gagnakali
 Kalinko
 Lansanya
 Sélouma

Prefectures of Guinea
Faranah Region